Asperdaphne tasmanica is a species of sea snail, a marine gastropod mollusk in the family Raphitomidae.

Description
The length of the shell attains 7 mm, its diameter 3 mm.

(Original description) The small shell is tumidly ovate. It is whitish, thin opaque. It contains 6 whorls, convex, subangulate, neatly keeled. The keels are small, rounded, elevated; It is elegantly cancellate, with regular distant small lirae. The keels in the body whorl alternate. The sutured is deeply impressed. The apex is obtuse and cancellate. The aperture is widely ovate. The outer lip is thin and deeply sinuated posteriorly. The lip is inconspicuous.  The columella is long and 
twisted. The siphonal canal is somewhat short.

Distribution
This marine species is endemic to Australia and occurs off South Australia, Tasmania and Victoria.

References

External links
 Gastropods.com: Asperdaphne (Asperdaphne) tasmanica
 
 Hedley C. (1922). A revision of the Australian Turridae. Records of the Australian Museum. 13(6): 213-359

tasmanica
Gastropods described in 1877
Gastropods of Australia